Nataliya Kurova (later Artamonova; ; born 22 April 1962) is a retired Russian speed skater who won a bronze medal at the European Speed Skating Championships in 1986. She also competed at the 1984 Winter Olympics in the 1500 m and finished in seventh place. 

Personal bests: 
500 m – 41.22 (1986)
1000 m – 1:21.05 (1987)
1500 m – 2:07.98 (1988)
 3000 m – 4:30.79 (1986)
 5000 m – 7:59.11 (1987)

References

1962 births
Living people
Olympic speed skaters of the Soviet Union
Speed skaters at the 1984 Winter Olympics
Russian female speed skaters
Soviet female speed skaters